The compound of cube and octahedron is a polyhedron which can be seen as either a polyhedral stellation or a compound.

Construction

The 14 Cartesian coordinates of the vertices of the compound are.
  6: (±2, 0, 0), ( 0, ±2, 0), ( 0, 0, ±2)
 8: ( ±1, ±1, ±1)

As a compound 

It can be seen as the compound of an octahedron and a cube. It is one of four compounds constructed from a Platonic solid or Kepler-Poinsot polyhedron and its dual.

It has octahedral symmetry (Oh) and shares the same vertices as a rhombic dodecahedron.

This can be seen as the three-dimensional equivalent of the compound of two squares ({8/2} "octagram"); this series continues on to infinity, with the four-dimensional equivalent being the compound of tesseract and 16-cell.

As a stellation 

It is also the first stellation of the cuboctahedron and given as Wenninger model index 43.

It can be seen as a cuboctahedron with square and triangular pyramids added to each face.

The stellation facets for construction are:

See also 
 Compound of two tetrahedra
 Compound of dodecahedron and icosahedron
 Compound of small stellated dodecahedron and great dodecahedron
 Compound of great stellated dodecahedron and great icosahedron

References
 

Polyhedral stellation
Polyhedral compounds